Cristóbal Muñoz López (born 1 February 2005) is a Spanish professional footballer currently playing as a forward or midfielder for Barcelona.

Club career
Born in Almería, Muñoz started playing football at his school, Colegio La Jarilla, before joining local side Almería in 2012. In 2016, he made the move to Pavía, signing an agreement with parent club Málaga to be able to represent both. He alternated between Pavía, where he scored 41 goals for the youth team, and Málaga, who he represented in youth tournaments.

As Muñoz developed in the Málaga academy, other top Spanish clubs became aware of his ability. This caused Málaga owner, Sheikh Abdullah Al Thani, to offer Muñoz a blank cheque in order for him to remain at the club. However, after receiving offers from Real Madrid and Barcelona, Muñoz decided to sign for the latter in early 2017.

In December 2017, he was named the best player at the LaLiga Promises tournament in Arona. This led to comparisons to Barcelona legend Lionel Messi, for their similar style of play.

In August 2021, he signed his first professional contract with Barcelona, tying him to the club until June 2024.

Personal life
Muñoz's brother, Kike, is also a footballer, and plays for Almería.

References

2005 births
Living people
Footballers from Almería
Spanish footballers
Association football forwards
Association football midfielders
UD Almería players
Málaga CF players
FC Barcelona players